Rhian is a feminine given name, a variation of rhiain, the common Welsh word for "maiden". 
Rhian (  is sometimes used, albeit rarely, as a male name, possibly a modern spelling variant of Ryan. The first root, Rhian-, derives from British rix "king"; the second, Rhiein-, derives from a word meaning "maiden, virgin".

Bearers of the name
 Saint Rhian, Welsh saint
 Rhian Benson, (1977- ) British singer
 Rhian Davies, (1981- ) Australian footballer
 Rhian Dodds, (1979- ) Canadian footballer
 Rhian Edwards, (1981- ) Welsh darts player
 Rhian Pugh, (1989- ) British gymnast
 Rhian Ramos, (1990- ) Filipino actress
 Rhian Samuel, (1944- ) Welsh composer
 Rhian Sheehan, New Zealand composer
 Rhian Touyz, (1959- ) Canadian medical researcher
 Rhian Wilkinson, (1982- ) British-Canadian footballer
 Rhian Brewster, (2000- ) English footballer for Liverpool FC
 Rhian Teasdale, (1994- ) British musician

See also
 Rhiannon (given name)

References

Welsh feminine given names